Sun Ribo (born December 18, 1976 in Zhangwu) is a former Chinese biathlete who competed in the 1998 Winter Olympics, the 2002 Winter Olympics and  the 2006 Winter Olympics.

References 

Chinese female biathletes
Biathletes at the 1998 Winter Olympics
Biathletes at the 2002 Winter Olympics
Biathletes at the 2006 Winter Olympics
1976 births
Olympic biathletes of China
Living people
Biathlon World Championships medalists
Asian Games medalists in biathlon
Biathletes at the 1999 Asian Winter Games
Biathletes at the 2003 Asian Winter Games
Medalists at the 1999 Asian Winter Games
Medalists at the 2003 Asian Winter Games
Asian Games gold medalists for China
Asian Games silver medalists for China
Asian Games bronze medalists for China
People from Fuxin
Sport shooters from Liaoning
Skiers from Liaoning